Genanaguy located at 32°41′54″S, 148°05′04″E is a cadastral parish of Kennedy County New South Wales.

References

Parishes of Kennedy County